Lithosiopsis is a genus of moths of the family Erebidae.

Species
Lithosiopsis bicoremata (Holloway, 2005) Borneo
Lithosiopsis louisiada (Hampson, 1926) New Guinea
Lithosiopsis papuana (Hampson, 1926) New Guinea, Seram, Sulawesi, Borneo
Lithosiopsis rectigramma (Hampson, 1907) India, Sri Lanka, Borneo
Lithosiopsis torsivena Hampson, 1895 Bhutan

References

Calpinae